Catch-22 is a satirical dark comedy miniseries based on the 1961 novel of the same name by Joseph Heller. It premiered on May 17, 2019, on Hulu in the United States. The series stars Christopher Abbott, Kyle Chandler, Hugh Laurie, and George Clooney, who is also an executive producer alongside Grant Heslov, Luke Davies, David Michôd, Richard Brown, Steve Golin, and Ellen Kuras. The series was written by Davies and Michôd and directed by Clooney, Heslov, and Kuras, with each directing two episodes.

Premise
John Yossarian (Christopher Abbott) is a United States Army Air Forces bombardier in World War II, furious that thousands of people are trying to kill him and that his own army keeps increasing the number of missions he must fly. He is trapped by the bureaucratic rule Catch-22, which considers a willingness to fly dangerous combat missions to be insane, yet a request to be relieved of duty on the grounds of insanity to be the process of a rational mind, so any such request must be denied.

He chose bombardier hoping the war would finish before his lengthy training but now sits exposed in the nose of a B-25 dropping bombs on strangers who are trying to kill him, unless he is avoiding flying by feigning illness, sabotaging his intercom, self-inflicted illness, or clandestinely moving the bomb line so it appears their target has already been captured.

The events occur in the Mediterranean theatre of World War II while the fictional 256th US Army Air Squadron is based on the (fictionalized) island of Pianosa, in the Mediterranean Sea, and conducting bombing raids over heavily defended fascist controlled Italy.

Cast and characters

Starring
 Christopher Abbott as Capt. John Yossarian
 Kyle Chandler as Colonel Cathcart
 Daniel David Stewart as Milo Minderbinder
 Rafi Gavron as Aarfy Aardvark
 Graham Patrick Martin as Ivor Orr
 Lewis Pullman as Major Major Major Major
 Austin Stowell as Nately
 Pico Alexander as Clevinger
 Jon Rudnitsky as McWatt
 Gerran Howell as Kid Sampson
 Hugh Laurie as Major — de Coverley
 Giancarlo Giannini as Marcello
 George Clooney as Major (later Colonel and eventually Brigadier General) Scheisskopf

Also starring
 Grant Heslov as Doc Daneeka
 Kevin J. O'Connor as Lt. Colonel Korn
 Julie Ann Emery as Marion Scheisskopf
 Josh Bolt as Dunbar 
 Tessa Ferrer as Nurse Duckett
 Jay Paulson as The Chaplain
 Harrison Osterfield as Snowden

Episodes

Production

Development
Around 2014, producer Richard Brown, writer Luke Davies and writer-director David Michôd discussed properties that they would like to tackle in limited series format similar to True Detective, which Brown had just executive produced. Davies brought up Heller's novel, which the trio agreed would benefit from a longer treatment than the two hours of Mike Nichols' 1970 feature film. The screen rights to the novel were held by Paramount Television where Anonymous Content had a deal. Davies and Michôd co-wrote the adaptation, which Brown developed at Anonymous. Michôd was originally set to direct until he became unavailable as a long-gestating feature film of his moved forward in production. The producers asked George Clooney to direct. He, along with his producing partner and frequent collaborator Grant Heslov, came on board as directors and executive producers.

On November 16, 2017, the production was announced. On January 12, 2018, it was announced that Hulu was in negotiations for the series and two days later it was confirmed that the production had been given a six episode order. On March 16, 2018, it was announced that Ellen Kuras was joining Clooney and Heslov in directing. They each directed two episodes, and Kuras also served as an executive producer. On May 7, 2018, it was announced that Italy's Sky Italia was joining the production as a co-producer.

Casting
Alongside the series order announcement, it was reported that in addition to directing the series George Clooney had been cast in the role of Colonel Cathcart. On March 9, 2018, it was announced that Christopher Abbott had been cast in the lead role of John Yossarian. On April 3, 2018, it was announced that Hugh Laurie had joined the main cast in the role of Major de Coverley. On April 13, 2018, it was announced that Clooney would no longer be playing the role of Colonel Cathcart and would instead assume the smaller supporting role of Major (later Colonel and eventually General) Scheisskopf. It was simultaneously announced that Kyle Chandler would be replacing him in the role of Cathcart. On May 3, 2018, it was reported that Daniel David Stewart, Austin Stowell, Rafi Gavron, Graham Patrick Martin, Pico Alexander, Jon Rudnitsky, Gerran Howell, and Lewis Pullman had joined the supporting cast as members of the "Merry Band." A few days later, it was announced that Tessa Ferrer and Jay Paulson had been cast as Nurse Duckett and The Chaplain, respectively. Towards the end of the month, it was reported that Giancarlo Giannini had been cast in the role of Marcello. On June 13, 2018, it was announced that Harrison Osterfield had been cast in the role of Snowden. On July 9, 2018, it was reported that Julie Ann Emery had been cast in the recurring role of Marion Scheisskopf.

Filming
Principal photography was scheduled to commence at the end of May 2018 in Sardinia and Viterbo  in Italy. On July 10, 2018, George Clooney was struck by a car while riding a motorcycle to the set of the series. He was taken to a hospital in Olbia where he was released later that same day. Filming for the series concluded on September 4, 2018, in Santa Teresa Gallura, Italy.

Aircraft
Four original aircraft were sourced for the filming of the miniseries: two North American B-25 Mitchell medium bombers, a Douglas C-47 Skytrain military transport, and a Junkers Ju 52 transport.

B-25J Mitchell – 44-30423 (N3675G) "Photo Fanny," manufactured in the United States by North American Aviation. Sourced from Planes of Fame Museum in Chino, California, USA. Portrayed in the miniseries as the fictional "Fly Me Hight!"
B-25J Mitchell – 45-8898 (N898BW) "Axis Nightmare," manufactured in the United States by North American Aviation. Sourced from Tri-State Warbird Museum in Batavia, Ohio, USA.
C-47A Skytrain – 42-100884 (TS423/N147DC) "Mayfly," manufactured by Douglas Aircraft Company in the United States. Sources from Aces High in North Weald, England.
Ju 52/3m – T.2B-212 (F-AZJU), manufactured by Junkers in Germany. Sourced from Jean-Baptiste Salis, in La Ferte-Alais, France.

By comparison, the 1970 film adaptation of Catch-22 featured 18 original B-25 Mitchells. Seventeen were in flying condition and one non-flyable example was destroyed in the filming of the crash landing scene. Fifteen of the 18 bombers used in that film remain intact to this day.

Release
The series premiered on May 17, 2019. In the United Kingdom, the series aired on Channel 4. In France, it aired on Canal+. In Australia, it was streamed on Stan. In Canada, it was streamed on Citytv Now.

Reception

Critical response
At the review aggregator website Rotten Tomatoes, the series holds an approval rating of 84% based on 90 reviews, with an average rating of 7.2/10. The website's critical consensus states, "Though not quite as sharp as Joseph Heller's seminal novel, Catch-22 handsomely rendered, hilariously horrifying exploration of war still soars thanks to its stellar cast and reverent adherence to its source material." On Metacritic, it has a weighted average score of 70 out of 100, based on 34 critics, indicating "generally favorable reviews".

Accolades

See also
 List of original programs distributed by Hulu

References

External links
 
 

2010s American drama television miniseries
2019 American television series debuts
2019 American television series endings
Catch-22
English-language television shows
Hulu original programming
Sky Atlantic (Italy) television programmes
Television shows based on American novels
Television series by Anonymous Content
Television series by Paramount Television